Live Monsters is an EP recorded and released by Jars of Clay. The EP contains songs that were recorded live on their tour in support of their studio album, Good Monsters. At first release, the only method of purchasing the album was either at one of their concerts or through Jars Of Clay's official store. However, Essential has since released the EP for purchase through the iTunes Store and was released to mainstream music stores on September 4, 2007.  The track listing of the two releases varies as "All My Tears" and "Love Me" from the initial release are substituted for "Good Monsters" and "Surprise".

Track listing

Live Concert/Jars of Clay official store version
Note: All songs written by Dan Haseltine, Charlie Lowell, Stephen Mason, and Matt Odmark unless otherwise noted
Note: Packaged in a cardboard cover
"All My Tears" – 5:45 (Julie Miller)
"Work" – 3:45
"Dead Man (Carry Me)" – 3:20
"There Is a River" – 3:48 (Charlie Lowell, Dan Haseltine, Matt Odmark, Stephen Mason, Ron Aniello)
"Oh My God" – 6:42
"Love Me" – 3:10
"Light Gives Heat" – 7:39

iTunes/mainstream release version
Note: All songs written by Dan Haseltine, Charlie Lowell, Stephen Mason, and Matt Odmark unless otherwise noted
Note: Comes in a regular jewel-case with backsleeve and 2-page insert
"Work" – 3:45
"Dead Man (Carry Me)" – 3:20
"There Is a River" – 3:48 (Charlie Lowell, Dan Haseltine, Matt Odmark, Stephen Mason, Ron Aniello)
"Good Monsters" – 4:05
"Oh My God" – 6:37
"Surprise" – 3:52
"Light Gives Heat" – 7:39

References 

Live EPs
Jars of Clay EPs
Jars of Clay live albums
2007 EPs
2007 live albums
Essential Records (Christian) live albums
Essential Records (Christian) EPs